In course of the Raqqa campaign (2016–2017), an international coalition, primarily composed of the Syrian Democratic Forces and CJTF–OIR, captured the Raqqa Governorate from the Islamic State of Iraq and the Levant, which had declared Raqqa city the capital of its self-proclaimed caliphate.

Anti-ISIL forces

Syrian Democratic Forces and integrated units 

SDF general headquarters - Gen. Mazlum Kobane (chief commander of the SDF), Rojda Felat (leading operations commander), Sipan Hemo (YPG chief commander), Cihan Shekh Ahmed (spokeswoman), Col. Talal Silo (spokesman), Brig. Gen. Hussam Awak (high-ranking commander)

  People's Protection Units (YPG), under command of Sipan Hemo
 Kobanî Brigade, led by Shevgar Himo
 Units from Afrin Canton
 Many other sub-units, led by Murat Amed, Merdali Süleymanovun (alias "Çiya Rûs", killed on 23 April 2017), and various other commanders (of which at least 7 were killed by 14 March 2017)
 PKK units
  Western leftist/anarchist YPG volunteers (c. 75+)
  International Anti-Fascist Battalion, led by Karim Franceschi
 Non-leftist international volunteers
  Women's Protection Units (YPJ), under command of Rojda Felat
 Units from Afrin Canton
Many other sub-units, commanded by Diljin Kobani, Clara Raqqa, Zagros Qamishlo, and others
 Anti-Terror Units (YAT)
  Syriac Military Council (MFS), under command of Kino Gabriel
 Bethnahrain Women's Protection Forces
 International volunteers
  Khabour Guards
 Martyr Joel Hanna group
  Nattoreh, under command of Robert Ichou
  Raqqa Hawks Brigade 
 Ghanim group, under command of Fayad Ghanim
 Northern Union, under command of Abu Yamen al-Meko
 Martyr Tasleem Jimmo Brigade, under command of Aboud al-Hafez
 Other sub-units, led by Abu Saleh al-Hindawi, Abu Mustafa, and others

  Tell Abyad Revolutionaries Brigade, under command of Abu Yazan
  Raqqa Martyrs Brigade, under command of Abu Sayaf
  Liberation Brigade
  Free Raqqa Brigade, under command of Abu Wael
 Jazeera Knights
  Jabhat Thuwar al-Raqqa, under command of Abu Issa
 Various sub-units, led by Capt. Abu al-Qasim al-Shammari, Farhan Abu Asker, Abdullah al-Helu, and others

  Army of Revolutionaries, under the command of Ahmad Sultan
 Kurdish Front, under the commander of Ali Çiçek
  Seljuk Brigade
  Hammam Turkmen Martyrs Brigade
 Tribal Forces, under the command of Abu Raad Bakary
 Homs Commandos Brigade
 Martyr Qasim Areef Battalion
  Northern Democratic Brigade
  Manbij Military Council, under the command of Muhammad Mustafa Ali, also known by his nom de guerre Abu Adel, since September 2017. The council was previously led by Adnan Abu Amjad until his death on 29 August 2017. The field commander of the council in Raqqa is Dilsuz Hashme.
 Northern Sun Battalion, under command of Muhammad Mustafa Ali
 Soldiers of the Two Holy Mosques Brigade
 Euphrates Liberation Brigade, led by Ibrahim Semho
  Syria's Tomorrow Movement, under the official leadership of Ahmad Jarba
 Elite Forces, commanded by Muhedi Jayila
 Saadallah al-Jabiri Battalion, led by Muhammad Ramadan until his death on 16 March 2017
 Liwa Owais al-Qorani remnants
  Al-Sanadid Forces, under command of Bandar al-Humaydi

 Deir Ezzor Military Council, under command of Ahmad Abu Khoula
 Sub-units led by Khalid Awad (killed on 22 February), and others
 Raqqa Regiment, led by Hassan Khalil
 Northern Brigade faction, led by Mihemed Al Musa
 Local pro-SDF tribes and militias
 Self-Defense Forces (HXP) - Siyamend Welat (chief commander of HXP)
 Elements of the 3rd Brigade
 Police
 Jazira Canton Asayish units
 SWAT units (HAT)
 Raqqa Internal Security Forces , led by Edrees Hamo and others

 International Freedom Battalion
  MLKP
 MLKP/KKÖ
  United Freedom Forces
  Revolutionary Communard Party, led by Ulaş Bayraktaroğlu (killed in May 2017)
  THKP-C/MLSPB
  TKP/ML TİKKO, led by Nubar Ozanyan (killed in August 2017)
  Bob Crow Brigade
  International Revolutionary People's Guerrilla Forces (IRPGF)
  TQILA
  RUIS
 Sinjar Resistance Units Êzîdxan Women's Units,

  PUK Peshmerga Counterterrorism Group

CJTF–OIR 

CJTF–OIR general headquarters - Maj. Gen. John W. Brennan (chief commander), Brig. Gen. Karl Harris (deputy commander)
  United States Armed Forces, under the command of CENTCOM, which is led by Kenneth F. McKenzie
  United States Air Force
  United States Air Force Combat Control Team
 
  United States Marine Corps
  11th Marine Expeditionary Unit
  1st Battalion, 4th Marines
  United States special operations forces
  75th Ranger Regiment
  5th Special Forces Group

  British Armed Forces
  Royal Air Force
 British special forces
 Special Air Service
  French Armed Forces
  French Air Force
 French special forces
  Bundeswehr
  German Air Force

Syrian government and allies (co-belligerent) 

  Syrian Arab Army
  Tiger Forces

  Russian Armed Forces
  Russian Air Force

Islamic State of Iraq and the Levant 

ISIL headquarters - Abu Bakr al-Baghdadi (self-proclaimed caliph and commander-in-chief); Abu Jandal al-Kuwaiti (leading commander for Raqqa defences 11–26 December); Abu Khattab al-Tunisi (ISIL high command member)

ISIL military forces ("Diwan al-Jund")
 Field army (organized into infantry, snipers, air defence, special forces, artillery forces, and the army of adversity)
 Defences of Al-Thawrah, under command of Abu Saraqeb al-Maghribi
 Sub-units in al-Thawrah District, led by various emirs, including Abu Umar al-Almani (killed on 25 March), Abu Zubeyir (killed on 2 April), and a Jordanian, who secretly worked as spy for CJTF–OIR until being extracted by US special forces in April
 Defences of Raqqa city; the eastern city was under command of Abu Khattab al-Tunisi until his death on 10 June 2017. At least some of the ISIL holdouts in Raqqa by October 2017 were under the command of a man known as "Abu Osama".
 Large number of foreign mujahideen 
 Local pro-ISIL militias
 Defences of al-Fakhikha, under command of a lower-ranking local commander/official, who was arrested by ISIL around 8 January on charges that he might have sold information to the Kurds or CJTF–OIR
 Other sub-units, led by Abu Zur al-Tunisi and Bilal al-Shawwash (both deserted to Jabhat Fateh al-Sham around 7 December), Abo Hamza Riadiat (killed on 8 January), and others
 Caliphate Army (elite forces)
 Katibah Nusantara elements, led by Zainuri Kamaruddin until his death on 13 January
 Rapid Response Battalion, personally led by Abu Jandal al-Kuwaiti until his death
 Caliphate Cubs (child soldiers)
 Abu Ubada al-Shami, one of the leading commanders and recruiters for the Caliphate Cubs, surrendered to the SDF on 20 Aug. 2017
 Committee for Military Manufacturing and Development
 Aviation sector
 Al Bara’ bin Malik Brigade

 External operations networks, led by Abd al-Basit al-Iraqi (killed by an airstrike on 12 November)
 Network of Boubaker Al-Hakim ( reported killed by an airstrike on 26 November), including sub-units led by Salah Gourmet, Sammy Djedou, and Walid Hamman (all killed on 4 December)
 Units responsible for contacts and coordination among ISIL forces, led by Abo Sufian al-Orani until his death on 8 January.

Administration
 Wilayat Raqqa, under ISIL Governor Abu Luqman.
 Majority of al-Breij tribe
 Elements of al-Ajeel tribe
 Elements of al-Na'im tribe
 Islamic police (Hibsa), led by Abu Muhammad al-Jazrawi since his appointment around 31 December
 Al-Khansaa Brigade
 Intelligence and propaganda networks, overseen by Mahmoud al-Isawi until his death on 31 December by an airstrike
 Ahmad Abousamra, a leading ISIL propagandist, was killed by an airstrike north of al-Thawrah city in January 2017
 Ministry of Information, led by Abu Ahmed al-Souri until he was replaced by Abu Jandal al-Masri around 31 December

Notes

See also 
 Raqqa campaign (2016–2017)
 Order of battle for the Battle of Mosul (2016–2017)

References

Bibliography 

 
 

Raqqa campaign (2016-17)